PJ Walters (born 23 April 1993) is a Namibian rugby union player who generally plays as a wing represents Namibia internationally and currently plays for Namibian club Welwitschias. He was included in the Namibian squad as the only uncapped player in the side for the 2019 Rugby World Cup which is held in Japan for the first time and also marks his first World Cup appearance. He made his international debut at the 2019 Rugby World Cup.

Career 
He made his international debut for Namibia in Namibia's opening match of the 2019 Rugby World Cup against Italy. He made it into the team as an injury replacement to Lesley Klim from the start of the match and was part of the losing side being thrashed by Italy 47-22 which also saw Namibia's 20th consecutive defeat at the World Cup.

References 

1993 births
Living people
Namibian rugby union players
Namibia international rugby union players
Rugby union wings
Golden Lions players
Welwitschias players